The 1924 Birmingham–Southern Panthers football team was an American football team that represented Birmingham–Southern College as an independent during the 1924 college football season. In their first season under head coach Harold Drew, the team compiled a 4–4–1 record.

Schedule

References

Birmingham-Southern
Birmingham–Southern Panthers football seasons
Birmingham-Southern Panthers football